Mount Baldy may refer to:

Mountains:
 Mount Baldy (Arizona)
 Mount San Antonio, California, usually referred to as Mount Baldy
 Mount Baldy (Nevada)
 Mount Baldy (Polk County, Oregon)
 Mount Baldy, Mineral County, Montana
 Mount Baldy (Beaver County, Utah)
 Mount Baldy (Alberta)
 Mount Baldy, British Columbia, Canada - see Mount Baldy Ski Area
 Baldy Mountain (Colfax County, New Mexico)
 A nickname for Mont Ventoux in France

Other uses:
 Mount Baldy, California, small mountain community in San Bernardino county on the slopes of Mount San Antonio (Mount Baldy), sometimes called Mount Baldy Village
 Mount Baldy (Sand Dune), the tallest sand dune on the southern shore of Lake Michigan

See also
 Mount Baldy Ski Lifts, a ski resort on Mount San Antonio in Los Angeles County, California
 Mount Baldy Zen Center
 South Baldy (New Mexico), the high point of the Magdalena Mountains
 List of peaks named Baldy (disambiguation)